Highway 2 is a road in Åland that starts in the capital city Mariehamn and ends in Sund. The length of the road is 31 kilometers. The road starts at the roundabout near Mariehamn Hospital, which also originates on Highway 1 and Highway 3.

In Jomala, the road bypasses the nearby St. Olaf's Church, on the cliff north of Finström just before Ödkarbyviken, on the cliff above the tunnel Uffe på Berget Café and Kastelholm Castle south of the village of Kastelholm, Sund.

Route 

The road passes through the following localities:
Mariehamn
Jomala
Finström
Sund

See also
Transport in Åland
Finnish national road 2

Source

References

Roads in Åland